Basame el cueo (Kiss My Ass) is an album by Catarrhal Noise.

The album was remastered and re-released in 2006 as Basame el cueo Duplison Platinum Edition 2006.  The only visible difference between the original and the remastered versions lies in the black and white sticker applied on the cover stating Duplison Platinum Edition 2006.

Track listing
"Intro"  – 0:09
"Rimini Riccione Portogruaro"  – 6:45
"No toca bilico"  – 2:52
"Tatiana"  – 2:55
"Espresso moka"  – 5:42
"Cecchinato"  – 2:01
"Col soriso"  – 2:24
"Guioni"  – 3:37
"L'amatriciana"  – 2:18
"Toni Bancae"  – 3:56
"Sergio"  – 3:29
"A bagalliera"  – 4:47
"Te te ricordi"  – 2:53
"Buso pa a merda"  – 2:29

Credits
 Daniele Russo (Bullo), vocals
 Alberto Varosi (Albyzzo), guitar
 Rocky Giò, bass
 Pelle, drums

2001 albums
2006 albums
Catarrhal Noise albums